Pseudogene is a database of pseudogenes annotations compiled from various sources.

See also
 Gene prediction
 Glossary of genetics
 Index of molecular biology articles

References

External links
 http://www.pseudogene.org

Biological databases
 *